The Malargüe River (in Spanish: Río Malargüe) is a river located in the southern zone of the Mendoza Province,  in the west of Argentina. It originates in the Malargüe lake in the Andes range, at 2,500 m above mean sea level, flows into the Malargüe Department and ends in the Llancanelo Lake, being its main tributary.

Its flow increases in the summer (29.00 m³/s), when the ice begins to melt, and decreases in the winter (6.31 m³/s). Near the city of Malargüe, it is contained by the Blas Brisoli Dam, which derives water for irrigation. Trout can be found in this river and there is a trout hatchery co-located with the dam.

External links
  

Rivers of Mendoza Province
Rivers of Argentina